The Devi Mahatmya or Devi Mahatmyam is a Hindu philosophical text describing the Goddess as the supreme power and creator of the universe. It is part of the Markandeya Purana.

Devi Mahatmyam is also known as the Durgā Saptashatī or Śata Chandī (शत् चण्डी). The text contains 700 verses arranged into 13 chapters. Along with Devi-Bhagavata Purana and Shakta Upanishads such as the Devi Upanishad, it is one of the most important texts of Shaktism (goddess) tradition within Hinduism.

The Devi Mahatmyam describes a storied battle between good and evil, where the Devi manifesting as goddess Durga leads the forces of good against the demon Mahishasura—the goddess is very angry and ruthless, and the forces of good win. In peaceful prosperous times, states the text, the Devi manifests as Lakshmi, empowering creation and happiness. The verses of this story also outline a philosophical foundation wherein the ultimate reality (Brahman in Hinduism) can also be female. The text is one of the earliest extant complete manuscripts from the Hindu traditions which describes reverence and worship of the feminine aspect of God. The Devi Mahatmyam is often ranked in some Hindu traditions to be as important as the Bhagavad Gita.

The Devi Mahatmyam has been particularly popular in eastern states of India, such as West Bengal, Bihar, Odisha and Assam, as well as Goa and Nepal. It is recited during Navratri celebrations, the Durga Puja festival, and in Durga temples across India.

Tulunadu, located in Coastal Karnataka draws inspiration from the Devi Mahatmyam for several plays in the form of Yakshagana that are conducted throughout the year at most of Shakti temples to depict the glorious powers of Devi to people of all generations since many centuries. The booking for Yakshagana troupes, not months but years in advance proves the devotion and importance of Devi Mahatmya storyline.

Etymology

The title  is a tatpurusha compound, literally translating to "the magnanimity of the goddess."

The text is called Saptaśati (literally a collection of seven hundred" or something that contains seven hundreds in number), as it contains 700 shlokas (verses).

According to Hindu Scriptures, " is "the Goddess of Truth and Justice who came to Earth for the establishment of Dharma ," from the adjective , "fierce, violent, cruel for evil forces not for good forces ." The epithet has no precedent in Vedic literature and is first found in a late insertion to the Mahabharata, where  and  appear as epithets."

History 

The Devi Mahatmyam, states C. Mackenzie Brown, is both a culmination of centuries of Indian ideas about the divine feminine, as well as a foundation for the literature and spirituality focused on the feminine transcendence in centuries that followed.

One of the earliest evidence of reverence for the feminine aspect of God appears in chapter 10.125 of the Rig Veda, also called Devīsūkta.

Hymns to goddesses are in the ancient Hindu epic Mahabharata, particularly in the later (100 to 300 CE) added Harivamsa section of it. The archaeological and textual evidence implies, states Thomas Coburn, that the Goddess had become as much a part of the Hindu tradition, as God, by about the third or fourth century.

Date and provenance
Devi Mahatmyam is a text extracted from Markandeya Purana, and constitutes the latter's chapters 81 through 93. The Purana is dated to the ~3rd century CE, and the Devi Mahatmyam was added to the Markandeya Purana either in the 5th or 6th century.  

The Markandeya Purana is one of the eighteen major Puranas.  Puranas are in the category of ancient Hindi writings that is considered to be "Smriti" (remembered by ordinary human beings and attributed to an author).  Other Hindu scriptures, such as the Vedas, are considered (in Hinduism) to have been heard and transmitted through direct knowledge by accomplished and enlightened sages and seers (called "rishis"); those texts are not "Smriti" but instead are categorized as "Śruti"

The Dadhimati Mata inscription (608 CE) quotes a portion from the Devi Mahatmyam. Thus, it can be concluded that the text was composed before the 7th century CE. It is generally dated between 400-600 CE. Wendy Doniger O'Flaherty dates the Devi Mahatmya to c. 550 CE, and rest of the Markandeya Purana to c. 250 CE.

Philosophy
The Devi Mahatmya text is a devotional text, and its aim, states Thomas Coburn, is not to analyze divine forms or abstract ideas, but to praise. This it accomplishes with a philosophical foundation, wherein the female is the primordial creator; she is also the Tridevi as the secondary creator, the sustainer, and destroyer. She is presented, through a language of praise, as the one who dwells in all creatures, as the soul, as the power to know, the power to will and the power to act. She is consciousness of all living beings, she is intelligence, she is matter, and she is all that is form or emotion.

The text includes hymns to saguna (manifest, incarnated) form of the Goddess, as well as nirguna (unmanifest, abstract) form of her. The saguna hymns appear in chapters 1, 4 and 11 of the Devi Mahatmya, while chapter 5 praises the nirguna concept of Goddess. The saguna forms of her, asserts the text, are Mahakali (destroyer, desire principle of mother, Tamasic), Mahalakshmi (sustainer, evolution principle of mother, Sattvic) and Mahasaraswati (creator, Action principle of mother, Rajasic), which as a collective are called Tridevi.  The nirguna concept (Avyakrita, transcendent) is also referred to as Maha-lakshmi. This structure is not accidental, but embeds the Samkhya philosophy idea of three Gunas that is central in Hindu scriptures such as the Bhagavad Gita.

The Samkhya philosophical premise asserts that all life and matter has all three co-existent innate tendencies or attributes (Guṇa), whose equilibrium or disequilibrium drives the nature of a living being or thing. Tamasic is darkness and destructiveness (represented as Kali in Devi Mahatmya), Sattvic is light and creative pursuit (Mahalakshmi), and Rajasic is dynamic energy qua energy without any intent of being creative or destructive (Mahasaraswati). The unmanifest, in this philosophy, has all these three innate attributes and qualities, as potent principle within, as unrealized power, and this unrealized Goddess dwells in every individual, according to Devi Mahatmya. This acknowledgment of Samkhya dualistic foundation is then integrated into a monistic (non-dualistic, Advaita) spirituality in Devi Mahatmya, just like the Upanishads, the Bhagavad Gita, the Bhagavata Purana and other important texts of Hinduism.

Contents

The Devī Māhātmya consists of chapters 81-93 of the Mārkandeya Purana, one of the early Sanskrit Puranas, which is a set of stories being related by the sage Markandeya to Jaimini and his students (who are in the form of birds). The thirteen chapters of Devi Māhātmya are divided into three charitas or episodes. At the beginning of each episode a different presiding goddess is invoked, none of whom is mentioned in the text itself.

The framing narrative of Devi Mahatmya presents a dispossessed king, a merchant betrayed by his family, and a sage whose teachings lead them both beyond existential suffering. The sage instructs by recounting three different epic battles between the Devi and various demonic adversaries (the three tales being governed by the three Tridevi, respectively, Mahakali (Chapter 1), Mahalakshmi (Chapters 2-4), and Mahasaraswati (Chapters 5-13). Most famous is the story of Mahishasura Mardini – Devi as "Slayer of the Buffalo Demon" – one of the most ubiquitous images in Hindu art and sculpture, and a tale known almost universally in India. Among the important goddess forms the Devi Mahatmyam introduced into the Sanskritic mainstream are Kali and the Sapta-Matrika ("Seven Mothers").

First episode

The first episode (chapter 1) of the Devi Mahatmyam depicts Devi in her  form as Mahakali. Here Devi is central and key to the creation as Maha-Maya, or, the great illusion/power that induces Narayana's deep slumber on the waters of the cosmic ocean prior to the manifestation of the Universe which is a continuous cycle of manifestation, destruction and re-manifestation. Two demons, Madhu-Kaitabha,  arise as thoughtforms from Vishnu's sleeping body and endeavour to vanquish Brahma who is preparing to create the next cycle of the Universe. Brahma sings to the Great Goddess, asking her to withdraw from Vishnu so he may awaken and slay the demons. Devi agrees to withdraw and Vishnu awakens and vanquishes the demons. Here Devi is praised as the agent who allows both the cosmic order to be upset & restored.

Middle episode
The middle episode (chapters 2-4) presents goddess Mahalakshmi in her avatar as Durga. She is a great Warrior Goddess, representing divine anger and the lethal energy against adharma. The episode stages a world under attack by the shape-shifting Mahishasura, an evil demon who uses deception to disarm his opponents, ultimately taking the form of a buffalo demon. He defeats the male gods individually, who fear total annihilation of the forces of good. They team up, combine their individual strengths and channel it to form a singular mass of Shakti from which Mahalakshmi is born as the endowed Durga. Riding a lion into battle, Durga captures and slays the buffalo demon, by cutting off its head. She then destroys the inner essence of the demon when it emerges from the buffalo's severed neck, thereby establishing order in the world.

In the theological practices of the goddess tradition of Hinduism, the middle episode is the most important. If a community or individual cannot recite the entire Devi Mahatmyam composition, the middle episode alone is recited at a puja or festival. Further, when the recital begins, the tradition is to complete the reading of the middle episode completely as a partial reading is considered to create a spiritual chidra or "chink in the armor".

Final episode
The final episode (chapters 5-13) depicts Devi in her form of Mahasaraswati. She is portrayed as arising from the koshas (cells) of Devi Parvati (the supreme form of the Goddess) and hence she is named Devi Kaushiki. Kali may be understood to represent the darker chthonic, transformative qualities of Devi's power or Shakti. Kali's emergence is chronicled in the 7th chapter. Kali, in the form of Chamunda emerges from Devi's eyebrows as a burst of psychic energy. She overpowers and beheads Chanda and Munda, and when she delivers their severed heads to Devi, she is dubbed Chamunda.

During a fierce battle in which the Great Goddess demonstrates her omnipotence by defeating powerful demons who terrify the devas, she encounters the fierce Raktabīja (chapter 8). Every drop of blood Raktabīja sheds transforms into another demon as it touches the earth. A unique strategy has to be devised to vanquish him. While Kaushiki attacks him with various weapons,  Kali, with her huge mouth and enormous tongue ferociously laps up  Raktabīja's blood, thus preventing the uprising of further demons.

The story continues in which Devi, Kali and a group of Matrikas destroy the demonic brothers Sumbha (chapter 10) and Nisumbha (chapter 9). In the final battle against Shumbha, Devi absorbs Kali and the matrikas and stands alone for the final battle. 

After the battle, the devas praise Devi as the support of this universe, as the intelligence in all men, as space, time and causation etc. Devi pleased with the Devas grants them a boon that she will always destroy the demons and bring peace to earth. She mentions her future incarnations and their respective acts (Chapter 11). Then the Devi mentions the benefits, accrual of peace, bliss, etc., of worshipping her and disappears (Chapter 12).

The sage finishes the tale. He tells the king and the merchant to take refuge in Devi to rid themselves of their delusion. Both the king and the merchant undertake penance and Devi grants them her vision. The king asks Devi for his lost kingdom and Devi grants it to him. The merchants asks Devi for wisdom and she grants it to him (Chapter 13). 

Chapter 8 of the 700 Verses consists of the well-known 32 Names of Durga mantra, which is chanted during the Navratri festival and, sometimes, as morning prayers in ashrams.

Symbolism of the three episodes

Devadatta Kali states that the three tales are "allegories of outer and inner experience". The evil adversaries of the Goddess, states Kali, symbolize the all-too-human impulses, such as pursuit of power, or possessions, or delusions such as arrogance. The Goddess wages war against this. Like the philosophical and symbolic battlefield of the Bhagavad Gita, the Devi Mahatmya symbolic killing grounds target human frailties, according to Kali, and the Goddess targets the demons of ego and dispels our mistaken idea of who we are.

Most hymns, states Thomas Coburn, present the Goddess's martial exploits, but these are "surpassed by verses of another genre, viz., the hymns to the Goddess". The hymnic portion of the text balances the verses that present the spiritual liberation power of the Goddess. These hymns describe the nature and character of the Goddess in spiritual terms:

 Brahma-stuti  (part 1 start),
 Sakradi-stuti (part 2 end),
 The "Ya Devi" Hymn (part 3 start),
 Narayani-stuti (part 3 end).

Angas (appendages)

As an independent text, Devī Māhātmya has acquired a number of "limbs" or "subsidiary texts" or "appendages" (angas) over the years "fore and aft". According to Coburn "artistic evidence suggests that the angas have been associated with the text since the fourteenth century." The angas are chiefly concerned with the ritual use of Devī Māhātmya and based on the assumption that the text will be recited aloud in the presence of images.

There are two different traditions in the Anga parayana. One is the trayanga parayana (Kavacha, Argala, Keelaka). The other is the Navanga parayana (Nyasam, Avahanam, Namani, Argalam, Keelakam, Hrudayam, Dhalam, Dhyanam, Kavacham). The navanga format is followed in kerala and some other parts in South India.

Preceding subsidiary texts

Durga Saptasloki also known as "Amba Stuti" - They are introduced as one-verse query from Siva who asks about the means of achieving what is desired, and a one verse response from the Goddess who says she will proclaim the relevant discipline (sadhana) by revealing Amba Stuti which consists of the seven verses indicated.
Devi-kavacham - The Devi Kavacham consisting of 61 Slokas is in Markandeya Purana. This Kavacham (armour) protects the reader in all parts of his body, in all places and in all difficulties.
Argala-stotram - Here Rishi Markandeya is telling his disciples in 27 inspiring couplets on the greatness of Devi. She has been described in all aspects and names and at the end of each Sloka, prayer is offered to Devi for material prosperity, physical fitness, fame and victory.
Keelakam - Here also Rishi Markandeya tells his disciples in 16 Slokas, the ways and means of removing obstacles faced by devotees, while reading Devi Mahatmya.
Ratri Suktam (Vedic) - Ratri Suktam (8 Slokas) has been taken from Rig Veda, 10th Mandala, 10th Anuvaka, 127th Sukta, which shows that Devi was worshipped from time immemorial. Devi is described as the all-pervading Supreme Lord of the Universe appearing in Omkara. Here Ratri is the Goddess who fulfills our prayers.
Kunjika Stotram is also a beautiful hymn written in the saptashati which is said to be the mixture of the three hymns i.e., Kavacham, Argala stotram, Keelakam and also Rahasya parvam (Murthy Rahasyam and Vaikrutika Rahasyam).It is said that Lord Shiva had recited this shloka to Parvathi at her attainment of BramhaGyaan. This shloka plays an important role in Devi Saptashati. It is at the ending of the book.
Ratri Suktam (Tantrik) - The hymn in the first chapter is the Tantrik Ratri Sukta.

Either the Ratri Suktam (Vedic) or Ratri Suktam (Tantrik) is read depending upon whether the ritual is Vaidic or Tantrik.

Succeeding subsidiary texts
Pradhana Rahasyam - "Deals with the process of creation. It is the secret about mula Prakrti who is the cause of creation."
Vaikritika Rahasyam - "Describes how the Godhead beyond change subjected itself to change, how the mula prakrti (productive), became vikriti (produced); hence the name Vaikritika Rahasyam."
Murti Rahasyam - "The incarnations, the Avatar murtis of the Goddess are mentioned."
Devi Suktam (Rig Vedoktam) - (According to Rig Veda): "The 8 Slokas composed by Vak, the daughter of Maharshi Ambharin, are from the Rig Veda, 10th Mandala, 10th Anuvaka, 125th Sukta. These Slokas express the truth realised by Vak, who identifies herself as Brahma Sakti, and expresses herself as 11 Rudras, 8 Vasus, 12 Adityas and all the Devas,— Indra, Agni and Asvini Kumaras—who are sustained by Her and She is the source, substratum and support of the whole world. She is verily Brahmasvarupini (embodiment of Brahman)."
Devi Suktam (Tantrik) - The hymn in chapter 5 is Tantrik Devi Suktam.

The number and order of these depend on the Sampradaya (tradition).

Either the Devi Suktam (Vedic) or Devi Suktam (Tantrik) is read depending upon whether the ritual is Vedic or Tantrik.

At the end of a traditional recitation of the text, a prayer craving pardon from the Goddess known as Aparadha Kshmapana Stotram is recited.

In many places, especially where the edition of Devi Mahatmya by Gita Press, Gorakhpur is chanted, an ancillary shloka called Siddha Kunjika stotra is chanted.

It is considered to be a stotra which completes the conferment of benefits of chanting the Devi Mahatmyam. It is small 10 line poem, describing a conversation between Lord Shiva and his consort Parvati with Lord Shiva revealing that the SiddhaKunjika stotra is a mysterious esoteric sloka to be chanted after the chanting of Devi Mahatmyam to be used with great care and precaution by practitioners. It says that the Goddess rules over certain characters of the alphabet, then praises her as the slayer of demons Shumbh, Nishumbh, Madhu, Kaitabh and prays to her to she rules as "Aimkar", sustains the world as "Hreem", lords over love as "Kleem", and as "Aimkaar" grants boons. As "Dham Dheem Dhoom", she is praised as "Dhurjati" (wife of Shiva) and as "Vaam Veem Voom", she is praised the Lord who rules Vaani (Sound) and as "Kraam Kreem Kroom", she is worshipped as Lord Kali and bestows prosperity when meditated as "Sham Sheem Shoom". It proceeds along these lines and closes out with Lord Shiva telling Goddess Parvati that chanting Devi Mahatmyam without chanting Siddha Kunjika Stotra leaves the reader bereft of getting the complete benefits of chanting the Devi Mahatmyam and says it is akin to crying out loud in an empty forest.

Significance

The Devi Mahatmya was considered significant among the Puranas by Indologists. This is indicated by the early dates when it was translated into European languages. It was translated into English in 1823, followed by an analysis with excerpts in French in 1824. It was translated into Latin in 1831 and Greek in 1853.

Devi Mahatmya has been translated into most of the Indian languages. There are also a number of commentaries and ritual manuals. The commentaries and ritual manual followed vary from region to region depending on the tradition.

Place in the Hindu canon

Devi Māhātmyam has been called the Testament of Shakta philosophy. It is the base and root of Shakta doctrine. It appears as the centre of the great Shakti tradition of Hinduism.

It is in Devi Mahatmya, states C Mackenzie Brown, that "the various mythic, cultic and theological elements relating to diverse female divinities were brought together in what has been called the 'crystallization of the Goddess tradition."

The unique feature of Devi Māhātmyam is the oral tradition. Though it is part of the devotional tradition, it is in the rites of the Hindus that it plays an important role. The entire text is considered as one single Mantra and a collection of 700 Mantras.

The Devi Māhātmyam is treated in the cultic context as if it were a Vedic hymn or verse with sage, meter, pradhnadevata, and viniyoga (for japa). It has been approached, by Hindus and Western scholars, as scripture in and by itself, where its significance is intrinsic, not derived from its Puranic context.

According to Damara Tantra "Like Aswamedha in Yagnas, Hari in Devas, Sapthsati is in hymns." "Like the Vedas; Saptasati is eternal" says Bhuvaneshwari Samhita.

There are many commentaries on Devi Māhātmya. 
 Guptavati by Bhaskararaya
 Nagesi by Nagoji Bhat
 Santhanavi
 Puspanjali
 Ramashrami
 Dhamsoddharam
 Durgapradeepam are some of them.

The significance of Devi Māhātmya has been explained in many Tantric and Puranic texts like Katyayani Tantra, Gataka Tantra, Krodha Tantra, Meru Tantram, Marisa Kalpam, Rudra Yamala, and Chidambara Rahasya. A number of studies of Shaktism appreciate the seminal role of Devi Māhātmya in the development of the Shakta tradition.

In popular tradition

The recitation of Devi Mahatmya is done during the Sharad Navaratri (Oct - Nov) in India. It is recited during Navaratri celebrations, the Durga Puja festival and in Durga temples of India. The text is also recited during the Vasantha Navaratri (March - April) in Uttarakhand, Jammu, Himachal Pradesh and other states of north India. It is also chanted during special occasions like temple kumbabhishekam and as a general parihara.

See also
 Brahmavaivarta Purana
 Chandi di Var
 Devi Upanishad
 Garh Jungle
 Mother Goddess
 Surath

Notes

References

Bibliography
Anna, Sri. Devi Māhātmyam with commentary in Tamil, Sri Ramakrishna Matam, Chennai, India, 1973.

 

Manna, Sibendu, Mother Goddess, Punthi Pustak, Calcutta, India, 1993.

 Jyotir Maya Nanda. Mysticism of the Devi Mahatmya Worship of the Divine Mother. South Miami, Fla: Yoga Research Foundation, 1994. 

Sankaranarayanan, S., Glory of the Divine Mother (Devī Māhātmyam), Nesma Books, India, 2001.
Sarma, Sarayu Prasad, Saptashatī Sarvasvam, in Sanskrit, - A cyclopaedic work on Devī Māhātmya. Rashtriya Sanskrita Samsthan, New Delhi, India, 2006.
Sri Durga Saptashatī, - Original text and ritual manual with Hindi translation, Gita Press, Gorakpur, India.
Swami Jagadiswarananda, Devi Māhātmyam English translation, Sri Ramkrishna Math, Madras, 1953.
Swami Satyananda Saraswati, Devi Mandir Publications, USA and Motilal Banarsidass Publishers Pvt. Ltd., Delhi, India, 1995.
Swami Sivananda, Devi Māhātmya (with a lucid running translation), The Divine Life Society, Shivanandanagar, India, 1994.

External links

Devi Mahatmya, Devanagari text
Devi Mahatmya, English Transliteration and commentary
Devi Mahatmyam recitation by Pranavanundha Saraswati Avadhootha Swamigal

Hindu texts
Shaktism
Durga Puja
Sanskrit texts
Puranas